The 2013 UK higher education strike was industrial action which took place on 31 October 2013. It was jointly co-ordinated by the UCU, Unite, and UNISON trade unions across the United Kingdom. University staff went on strike in response to a real-terms pay cut of 13% since 2008. The strike started at midnight with the mass walk-out of security guards from the Glasgow Caledonian University. Classes were cancelled at every Scottish university except the University of the Highlands and Islands.

References 

Higher Education Strike
UK higher education strike
Education strikes
Labour disputes in the United Kingdom
Higher Education Strike